Urethral orifice can refer to:
 Urinary meatus (external urethral orifice)
 Internal urethral orifice